Hasanabad (also Romanized as Ḩasanābād) is a village in Garmsir Rural District, in the Central District of Ardestan County, Isfahan Province, Iran. At the 2006 census, its population was 245, in 50 families.

References 

Populated places in Ardestan County